Hymn to the Immortal Wind is the fifth studio album by Japanese post-rock band Mono, released 24 March 2009 on Temporary Residence Limited.

The album was recorded and mixed in June and November 2008 at the Electrical Audio Recording Studios, Chicago, Illinois, by Steve Albini. A music video for "Follow the Map" was released to promote the album. This is a concept album, and there is a short story enclosed with the CD to go along with the music.

Track listing

Personnel
Mono
 Takaakira "Taka" Goto - electric guitars
 Tamaki Kunishi - bass guitar, piano, harpsichord, glockenspiel
 Yasunori Takada - drums, tympani, cymbals, glockenspiel
 Yoda - electric guitars, Hammond B3 organ

Production
 Steve Albini - recording, engineering, mixing
 John Golden - mastering

Orchestra

Mark Anderson, cello
Mellisa Bach, cello
Eille Bakkum, viola
Inger Petersen Carle, violin
Alison Chesley, cello
Dave Max Crawford, conductor
Jennifer Clippert, flute

Wendy Cotton, cello
Margaret Daly, cello
Michael Duggan, cello
Katherine Hughes, cello
Jill Kaeding, cello
Carol Kalvonjian, violin
Carmen Llop Kassinger, violin

Kent Kessler, contrabass
Andra Kulans, violin, viola
Jody Livo, violin
Ellen O'Hayer, cello
Vannia Phillips, viola
John Sagos, viola
Mary Stolper, flute

Ben Wedge, viola
Steve Winkler, violin
Susan Voelz, violin
Paul Von Mertens, conductor
Jeff Yang, violin
Richard Yeo, cello
Chie Yoshinaka, violin

References

External links
 

2009 albums
Temporary Residence Limited albums
Mono (Japanese band) albums
Albums produced by Steve Albini
Concept albums